Hamza Asrir is a Moroccan professional footballer who plays as a defender for Wydad AC.

References

1993 births
Living people
Wydad AC players
Association football defenders
Moroccan footballers